Mesostylini is a weevil tribe in the subfamily Entiminae.

Genera 
Amesostylus – Kasakhstania – Mesostylus – Parastylus

References 

 Reitter, E. 1913: Bestimmungs-Schlüssel der mir bekannten europäischen Gattungen der Curculionidae, mit Einschluss der mir bekannten Gattungen aus dem palaearctischen Gebiete. Verhandlungen des naturforschenden Vereines in Brünn, 51 (1912): 1-90.
 Alonso-Zarazaga, M.A.; Lyal, C.H.C. 1999: A world catalogue of families and genera of Curculionoidea (Insecta: Coleoptera) (excepting Scolytidae and Platypodidae). Entomopraxis, Barcelona.

External links 

Entiminae
Polyphaga tribes